Synaphea incurva is a shrub endemic to Western Australia.

The clumped to spreading shrub usually blooms between September and November producing yellow flowers.

It is found along the south coast on slopes in a small area in the Great Southern region of Western Australia between Albany and Denmark where it grows in sandy soils.

References

Eudicots of Western Australia
incurva
Endemic flora of Western Australia
Plants described in 1995